Ladies Invited is the fourth studio album by American rock band The J. Geils Band. The album was released in November 1973, by Atlantic Records.

The model for the cover artwork, illustrated by the noted fashion artist Antonio, was reportedly actress Faye Dunaway, who married lead singer Peter Wolf the following year.

Record World said of the single "Did You No Wrong" that "Geils takes off on some incredible guitar riffs and production from Szymczyk does no wrong."

Track listing
All songs written by Peter Wolf and Seth Justman.

Personnel
Peter Wolf – lead vocals
J. Geils – guitar
Magic Dick – harmonica
Seth Justman – keyboards
Danny Klein – bass
Stephen Jo Bladd – drums

Production
Producer: Bill Szymczyk
Engineers: Allan Blazek, Bill Szymczyk
Mastering: Zal Schreiber
Special assistance: Juke Joint Jimmy
Arrangers: J. Geils Band
Personal managers: Stephen Bladd, Danny Klein
Design: Ira Friedlander, Douglas T. Slade
Cover design: Antonio, Douglas T. Slade
Photography: Robert Agriopoulos
Illustrations: Antonio

Charts

References

1973 albums
The J. Geils Band albums
Albums produced by Bill Szymczyk
Atlantic Records albums